This is a list of properties and districts in Crisp County, Georgia that are listed on the National Register of Historic Places (NRHP).

Current listings

|}

References

Crisp
Buildings and structures in Crisp County, Georgia